Samir Abdel Fattah is a Yemeni short story writer, novelist and playwright. He was born in Jibla, Yemen in 1971, and he moved to Sanaa in 1982, where he studied economics and business at university. He is known for his short story collections, the first of which, Ranin al-matar, appeared in 2002. He has published two more collections since. He has written two novels: Riwayat al-Sayyid Mim (2007) and Ibn al-nasr (2008). He has also written plays for the theatre.

Abdel Fattah is a versatile writer, with a particular interest in European literature, especially that of Russia. He often deals with existential themes and his work is regarded as part of the avant-garde in modern Yemeni literature. In 2009, he teamed up with fellow writers Nadia al-Kokabany, Wajdi al-Ahdal and Ali al-Moqri to form a literary group called Meeting Yesterday. His work has been translated into Italian and was included in an anthology of contemporary Yemeni writers called Perle Dello Yemen (2009).

References

Yemeni writers
Yemeni novelists
Living people
Year of birth missing (living people)